Franco may refer to:

Name 
 Franco (name)
 Francisco Franco (1892–1975), Spanish general and dictator of Spain from 1939 to 1975
 Franco Luambo (1938–1989), Congolese musician, the "Grand Maître"

Prefix 
 Franco, a prefix used when referring to France, a country
 Franco, a prefix used when referring to French people and their diaspora, e.g. Franco-Americans, Franco-Mauritians
 Franco, a prefix used when referring to Franks, a West Germanic tribe

Places 
 El Franco, a municipality of Asturias in Spain
 Presidente Franco District, in Paraguay
 Franco, Virginia, an unincorporated community, in the United States

Other uses 
 Franco (band), Filipino band
 Franco (General Hospital), a fictional character on the American soap opera General Hospital
 Franco, the Luccan franc, a 19th-century currency of Lucca, Italy
 Franco, Ciccio e il pirata Barbanera, a 1969 Italian comedy film directed by Mario Amendola
 Franco, ese hombre, a 1964 documentary film by Spanish director José Luis Sáenz de Heredia
 Franco-Arabic, the Arabic chat alphabet

See also 
 Gianfranco
 Francis (given name)
 Franko (disambiguation)
 
 
 Duke of Franco, a hereditary title in the Spanish nobility